The following is a list of songs that have been the subject of plagiarism disputes. In several of the disputes the artists have stated that the copying of melody or chord progression was unconscious. In some cases the song was sampled or covered. Some cases are still awaiting litigation.

Songs subject to plagiarism disputes

See also
Sampling (music)
Music copyright

References

plagiarism